Pierre Amoyal (born 22 June 1949 in Paris) is a French violinist and is the artistic director of the Conservatory of Lausanne.

He owns the  "Kochanski" Stradivarius of 1717. It was stolen from him in 1987 and recovered in 1991.

Life and career 

He studied at the Conservatoire de Paris, graduating at age 12 with a First Prize (in 1961). He then won the Ginette Neveu Prize in 1963, and the Paganini Prize in 1964. At age 17, he traveled to Los Angeles for five years of study with Jascha Heifetz, which culminated in participating in chamber-music recordings with Heifetz.  During this time he won the Enescu Prize (1970). He has toured extensively, made numerous recordings and played with many major conductors, such as Sir Georg Solti, with whom he made his European debut at the age of 22, Pierre Boulez, and Herbert von Karajan with the Berlin Philharmonic

He was violin teacher at the Conservatoire de Paris and then at the Conservatory of Lausanne, until June 2014. Then he was teacher at the Mozarteum University of Salzburg and in Japan.

He is the artistic director of the Conservatory of Lausanne. In 2002, he founded the Camerata de Lausanne, a string orchestra. He also created and organised the "violin and piano master-classes" of the Music Academy of Lausanne since 1991.

He was made a Chevalier of Arts and Letters in 1985 and promoted to Knight of the National Order of Merit in 1995. He also received the Prix du rayonnement de la Fondation vaudoise pour la culture in 2002, and the Prix de Lausanne in 2006.

External links
 Official website
 Académie de musique de Lausanne
 Académie internationale d'été de Nice profile
 http://www.bach-cantatas.com/Bio/Amoyal-Pierre.htm

20th-century French male classical violinists
Conservatoire de Paris alumni
Living people
1949 births
Knights of the Ordre national du Mérite
Chevaliers of the Ordre des Arts et des Lettres
21st-century French male classical violinists
Academic staff of the Conservatoire de Paris
Academic staff of Mozarteum University Salzburg
Academic staff of Lausanne Conservatory
Musicians from Paris
Enescu Prize winners